John Ralston is an American acoustic/electric guitarist singer-songwriter. He is originally from Lake Worth, Florida, United States, and is a member of the band Legends of Rodeo (formerly called Recess Theory), which is currently on an indefinite hiatus.  He has released two full-length albums, two EPs, and released his third solo record, Shadows of the Summertime in 2011. A 7"single of "Jesus Christ" b/w "A Marigny Christmas" was released in early 2011.

Discography
Needle Bed (Vagrant Records, 2006)
Sorry Vampire (Vagrant Records, 2007)
Shadows of the Summertime (Self Released, 2011)

EPs
When We Are Cats (Self Released, 2005)
Box of Chocolates (Vagrant Records, 2006)
Fragile (Vagrant Records, 2007)
White Spiders (Self Released, 2008)
Jesus Christ (24 Hour Service Station, 2011)
Wildlands (Self Released, 2011)
Verbal Tan (Self Released, 2017)

Production credits
"Something More" by Matt Minchew (2011)
"The Sun Clouded Over" by Keith Michaud (2008)

Non-album tracks
 "Everything to Be Afraid Of" – played live
 "Blacklisted (Demo)" – released on his MySpace page, no longer available
 "Rivermountainview" – released on his Myspace
 "Sea Garden Blue" – released on Fresh Ink sampler

Films
The song "Gone, Gone, Gone" is featured in the 2008 indie film The Other Side of the Tracks.

References

External links
John Ralston

American rock musicians
American rock songwriters
American rock singers
Singer-songwriters from Florida
Year of birth missing (living people)
Living people
Dashboard Confessional members
24 Hour Service Station artists